Alejandro Zamora Barbero (born 22 April 1984) is a Spanish footballer who plays as a defensive midfielder.

He spent the vast majority of his career in Segunda División B, playing more than 200 matches for eight clubs. His professional input consisted of 60 Segunda División appearances over three seasons (with Salamanca and Recreativo), and one in La Liga with Betis.

Club career
Born in Madrid, played youth football with local Real Madrid, but only represented the C team as a senior, also being loaned to Real Oviedo during his spell. In 2006, he signed with Real Betis, being all but associated with the reserves for three full seasons. On 2 December 2007, he played his first and only La Liga game with the main squad, featuring the full 90 minutes in a 0–2 home loss against Atlético Madrid which was also manager Héctor Cúper's last match on the bench. 

In June 2009, Zamora signed for UD Salamanca on a two-year contract. Two years later, after suffering relegation, he joined fellow league side Recreativo de Huelva, making his competitive debut on 7 September by scoring an own goal in a 0–2 home defeat to Elche CF in the second round of the Copa del Rey. He collected only 875 minutes in the league, also being sent off against AD Alcorcón for a late tackle on Quini in the 56th minute of an eventual 1–2 loss. 

Afterwards, Zamora moved to the lower leagues, representing CD Castellón (Tercera División), CP Cacereño– after only a few months, he hinted of leaving– and CD Guadalajara. On 30 July 2015, he moved to Mérida AD still in division three, stating upon his arrival at the latter he "had come to the club to bring it to where it deserves". His official debut took place on 22 August, in a 1–0 victory at former team Betis B.

Club statistics

References

External links

Betisweb stats and bio 

1984 births
Living people
Footballers from Madrid
Spanish footballers
Association football defenders
Association football midfielders
Association football utility players
La Liga players
Segunda División players
Segunda División B players
Tercera División players
Real Madrid C footballers
Real Oviedo players
Betis Deportivo Balompié footballers
Real Betis players
UD Salamanca players
Recreativo de Huelva players
CD Castellón footballers
CP Cacereño players
CD Guadalajara (Spain) footballers
Mérida AD players
CE L'Hospitalet players
Extremadura UD footballers
San Fernando CD players
SCR Peña Deportiva players